Gary Owen is the name of:

People
 Gary Owen (snooker player) (1929–1995), Welsh snooker player
 Gary Owen (politician) (born 1944), Michigan politician
 Gary Owen (footballer) (born 1958), English footballer
 Gary Owen (playwright) (born 1972), Welsh playwright
 Gary Owen (comedian) (born 1974), American comedian

Other
 "Garryowen" (air), Irish quickstep tune, also called "Gary Owen"

See also
 Gary Owens (1934–2015), American disc jockey and voice actor
 Gareth Owen (disambiguation)
 Garryowen (disambiguation)
 Garry Owen (actor) (1902–1951), American actor

Owen, Gary